The year 1800 in science and technology included many significant events.

Events
 Royal Institution of Great Britain granted a royal charter.

Astronomy
 The central star of the Ring Nebula is discovered by Friedrich von Hahn: the central star is a white dwarf star with a temperature of between 100,000 and 120,000 K.

Chemistry
 Beryllium is discovered by Johann Bartholomäus Trommsdorff in beryl from Saxony, a new earth; he calls it Agusterde ("August Earth").
 Fulminates are discovered by Edward Howard.
 Antoine François, comte de Fourcroy, begins publication in Paris of the comprehensive chemistry textbook Système des connaissances chimiques et de leurs applications aux phénomènes de la nature et de l'art.

Earth sciences
 October – Volcanic eruption of Mount Guntur in West Java.

Exploration
 The Antipodes Islands, at this time the home of large herds of fur seals, are discovered by the crew of the British ship HMS Reliance.
 Jacques Labillardière publishes Relation du Voyage à la Recherche de la Pérouse in Paris.

Medicine
 March 22 – Company of Surgeons granted a royal charter to become the Royal College of Surgeons in London.
 September – Philippe Pinel publishes Traité médico-philosophique sur l'aliénation mentale ou la manie (Medical and philosophical Treatise on insanity or mania) which marks the beginning of an in-depth change in the approaches and methods of work with "lunatics".
 Xavier Bichat publishes Traité sur les membranes and Recherches physiologiques sur la vie et la mort, pioneering texts in histology and pathology.
 Andrea Vaccà Berlinghieri publishes Traité des maladies vénériennes (Treatise on venereal diseases).
 Georges Cuvier begins publishing his Leçons d'anatomie comparée (5 volumes, 1800-1805).

Physics
 Alessandro Volta devises the first chemical battery, thereby founding the discipline of electrochemistry.
 Infrared rays are discovered by William Herschel, an English astronomer of German origin.

Technology
 Yeast is discovered as a new way to make beer ferment (beer made before 1800 was lambic).
 Robert Fulton builds a practical experimental manually-propelled naval submarine Nautilus in France (first test dive July 29 at Rouen).
 Henry Maudslay develops the first industrially practical screw-cutting lathe, allowing standardisation of screw thread sizes for the first time, in London.
 The first design for a cast iron twin leaf swing bridge is produced by Ralph Walker for London Docks.

Zoology
 November 4 – Major-General Thomas Davies first describes the superb lyrebird.

Awards
 Copley Medal: Edward Charles Howard

Births
 January 14 – Ludwig von Köchel, Austrian musicologist and botanist (died 1877)
 February 11 – H. Fox Talbot, English pioneer of photography (died 1877)
 February 12 – John Edward Gray, English taxonomist (died 1875)
 February 23 – William Jardine, Scottish naturalist (died 1874)
 February 27 – Robert Willis, English mechanical engineer, phonetician and architectural historian (died 1875)
 March 3 – Heinrich Georg Bronn, German geologist, paleontologist (died 1862)
 March 14 – James Bogardus, American inventor (died 1874)
 April 15 – James Clark Ross, English explorer of the Polar regions (died 1862)
 May 25 – Leonard Jenyns, English natural historian (died 1893)
 July 31 – Friedrich Woehler, German chemist (died 1882)
 August 26 – Félix Archimède Pouchet, French natural scientist (died 1872)
 August 20 – Bernhard Heine, German physician, bone specialist and inventor (died 1846) 
 September 22 – George Bentham, English botanist (died 1884)
 October 23 – Henri Milne-Edwards, French zoologist (died 1885)
 December 25 – John Phillips, English geologist (died 1874)
 December 29 – Charles Goodyear, American inventor of the vulcanization process (died 1860)
 Anna Volkova, Russian chemist (died 1876)

Deaths
 January 1 – Louis-Jean-Marie Daubenton, French naturalist (born 1716)
 January 16 – Johann Christian Wiegleb, German chemist (born 1732)
 March 14 – Daines Barrington, English naturalist (born 1727)
 March 29 – Marc René, marquis de Montalembert, French military engineer (born 1714)
 May 23 – Henry Cort, English ironmaster (born 1740)
 June 20 – Abraham Gotthelf Kästner, German mathematician (born 1719)
 July 14 – Lorenzo Mascheroni, Italian mathematician (born 1750)
 September 10 – Johann David Schoepff, German naturalist and physician (born 1752)
 October 4 – Johann Hermann, German physician, naturalist (born 1738)
 November 5 – Jesse Ramsden, English scientific instrument maker (born 1735)
 December – Jean-Baptiste Audebert, French natural history painter (born 1752)
 December 30 – Thomas Dimsdale, English physician, banker and politician, pioneer of variolation (born 1712)

References

 
18th century in science
1800s in science